Lish (also Romanized as Līsh) is a village in Tutaki Rural District, in the Central District of Siahkal County, Gilan Province, Iran. At the 2006 census, its population was 417, in 116 families.

References 

Populated places in Siahkal County